Aleksandr Soldatenkov may refer to:
 Aleksandr Soldatenkov (fencer) (born 1887), Russian fencer
 Aleksandr Soldatenkov (footballer) (born 1996), Russian footballer
 Aleksandr Soldatenkov (inventor) (born 1927), Russian rocket pioneer